Mugamoodi is a 2012 Indian Tamil-language superhero film written and directed by Mysskin. The film stars Jiiva, Narain, and Pooja Hegde who makes her acting debut through this film. While Nassar, Selva and Girish Karnad play supporting roles. The film is about a martial artist who cannot tolerate injustice and corruption and hence turns into a vigilante to fight against it for a better society. 

The film was dedicated to Bruce Lee. The music was composed by K with cinematography by Sathyan Sooryan. Mugamoodi was released theatrically on 31 August 2012 and opened to mixed reviews from critics and audience.

Plot
Anand aka Bruce Lee, is a college graduate who hates the idea of 9-5 jobs. He studies martial arts with a group of similarly jobless friends. Attempting to recruit new students to pay tuition fees and save their school, he gets involved in a brawl and falls for Shakthi, the daughter of DCP Gaurav. In Chennai, A series of heists are happening across India, which has left dozens dead and countless amounts of money stolen. The police believe that a new robbery is about to take place. Anand's grandfather advises him to make Shakthi see him as a Hero. 

Anand borrows and wears a superhero costume, who introduce introduce himself as Mugamoodi to Shakthi and tries to impress the children with his skills and accidentally ends up in the middle of a police chase. He helps the police capture one of the bandits. However, the gang shoots the captured member dead when police are transferring him and kill an Inspector, who was involved in the arrest. The news that Mugamoodi captured one of the suspects, which police could not catch them in many months, spreads across the city and makes Shakthi begin to like Mugamoodi. Gaurav finds a match between a fingerprint from the crime scene and one from police records. Anand decides to visit Shakthi again, unmasked to reveal his identity and confess his love to her. 

When Anand arrives, he encounters a gang member, who shoots Gaurav, Anand tries to seize him, But the gunman escapes after the gun is seized by Anand and the family believe Anand shot Gaurav, so he is being chased by the police and on the run. The gang kills Viji, Anand's friend, who went with him to visit Shakthi. Anand is again seen by police alone with a dead body and is naturally thought responsible for the killing. Anand's grandfather and brother create a batman-styled-superhero costume with a blue bodysuit, a black belt with the letter M on it, a black superhero mask, black leather boots and gloves. Gaurav survives and the gang decides to kill him and his family in the hospital. Anand (masked himself as Mugamoodi) saves them by defeating the gang with his kung-fu skills and takes Gaurav's police documents containing the latest findings of the case, including the fingerprint match, because he wants to avenge Viji's death on his own. 

To Anand's shock, The police findings in the documents are against Sifu Chandru, who is his martial arts teacher. Chandru reveals that he is not connected to those cases and reveals that Anguchamy aka Dragon is behind the crimes. They learned kung-fu in the same school 22 years ago. Meanwhile, Dragon also somehow learns that Mugamoodi is Anand. His gang raids Chandru's school to kill Anand, but they kill Chandru when he is nowhere to be seen. The gang seizes a port and kidnaps 30 children, along with three adults including Shakthi, as hostages to blackmail the police. They demand Mugamoodi drive a van of gold alone and the police arrange a ship and guarantees their safety across the Indian border, The gang threaten to kill the hostages if refused. 

Mugamoodi agrees to drive the gold, where a fight ensues between him and Dragon. During the fight, Dragon takes off Mugamoodi's mask and reveals his identity to Shakthi. He also confesses that Anand did not shoot Gaurav, but his brother Anthony did. With the help of his grandfather and friends that had him sneaked into the port, Anand kills some key members of the gang. A fight ensues between Anand and Dragon, Dragon hangs from a ladder, holding on with a hammer. Anand tries to pull Dragon, but Dragon instead falls to his death in the sea. Anand manages to release all the hostages and Shakthi tells him to continue his service as "Mugamoodi".

Cast

 Jiiva as Anand (Bruce Lee / Mugamoodi)
 Narein as Anguchamy (Dragon)
 Pooja Hegde as Shakthi, Anand's love interest  (Voice dubbed by Savitha Reddy)
 Nasser as DCP Gaurav, Shakthi's father
 Selvaah as Master Sifu Chandru
 Girish Karnad as Anand's grandfather
 Aadukalam Naren as Anand's father
 Anupama Kumar as Roshini, Shakthi's mother
 Aadukalam Murugadoss as Anand's friend
 Kalaiyarasan as Viji
 Ray as Shakthi's brother
 Vaishnavi as Shakthi's sister
 Misha Ghoshal as Police officer's wife
 Darshan as Dragon's sidekick
 Krishna Kumar as Commissioner (uncredited cameo appearance)

Production

Development

In September 2008, UTV Motion Pictures agreed to produce Mysskin's script, Mugamoodi (Mask), and subsequently signed on leading actor Suriya to play the role of the protagonist. Pre-production work for the film began in late 2008, with the film also being referred to by the media as Agni Puthran. The film was reported to be made at a cost of 50 crore with A. R. Rahman as music composer and Suriya portraying a karate fighter in the film. However, in July 2009, Suriya opted out, and unsuccessful discussions were held with Vishal Reddy to replace him, forcing Mysskin to stall the project. As the project remained dormant, Mysskin temporarily shelved the project and moved on to script a horror film.

Casting

In October 2010, Arya signed on for the film with N. Linguswamy's Thirupathi Brothers production house replacing UTV as producers. However, within months, Arya had pulled out as had Linguswamy. In June 2011, a new Mumbai-based company had taken the production reins whilst Jiiva, after the commercial success of his political thriller Ko, had signed on to portray the lead role. Later that month, it was announced that Narain, who had worked with Mysskin in both Chithiram Pesuthadi and Anjathe, would portray the role of the lead antagonist with reports suggesting that the role would be reminiscent of The Joker / Scarecrow from English films, The Dark Knight and Batman Begins respectively. Narain claimed that his villainy in the film would be totally brutal. His character in the movie has no shades and is absolutely negative. In early July 2011, sources reported that Amala Paul had been signed up to portray the lead female character in the film, which the actress dismissed, with Dhananjayan of UTV also confirming that Amala was not approached for the role. Pooja Hegde, second runner-up of the 2011 Miss Universe India beauty pageant, was eventually finalized as the female lead. K, who had scored for Mysskin's Yuddham Sei in 2010, was selected as the film composer over two other music directors, while Madhan Karky would pen the lyrics, associating for the first time with Mysskin. Veteran Telugu actor Akkineni Nageswara Rao was added to the cast in November 2011, which proved false, and he was replaced by Girish Karnad, while Prakash Raj was also reported to be playing an important role. The following month, Nassar Muhammad was selected to portray a police officer. Pooja Hegde appeared as Jiiva's lover in the film.

Reports further claimed that both Jiiva and Narain would undergo special training in martial arts with experts from the Shaolin Temple in China being flown in. A large group of young aspiring artists were roped in to be part of the fight sequences which are touted be the highlight of the movie. The artists were trained for over 6 months at Mansuria Kung Fu YMCA, Nandanam, Chennai. In fact, a lot of the kung fu content of the film were handled by the Grand Master R. Shekhar.

Effects and design

High-end gadgets to be used in the film were reportedly designed by the Indian Institutes of Technology (IIT), while teams from the National Institute of Fashion Technology (NIFT) were roped in to create the costumes and looks of the characters. Furthermore, a Los Angeles-based firm would handle special effects, while action sequences are planned to be choreographed by stuntmen from Hong Kong. Costumes are designed by Gabriella Wilkins, and it is said that Jiiva's superhero outfit weighs more than 10 kg.

Filming

Shooting of the film started officially on 12 December 2011 with the opening scene of kung fu as that was so spoken about. The film is expected to be released during Summer 2012. The film was being canned in the nights in and around Triplicane in Chennai where the fight scene of Jiiva and Narain was shot in terrace. Mysskin is planning a 20-day schedule to shoot the climax at Karaikal. The shoot concluded at Karaikal where daredevil stunts were performed by the lead actor at an altitude of 180 feet high where in the Karaikal port's conveyor belt passes over. Many scenes were also filmed at AVM studio where huge hospital set was erected and also at Victoria hall, Deaf and Dumb school.; Tony Leung Siu Hung, a stunt coordinator from Hong Kong, has joined the climax shoot of the film that's being canned in a massive scale at Karaikal.

Music

Mugamoodi'''s score and soundtrack were composed by K, who had worked on Mysskin's previous venture Yuddham Sei as well. The soundtrack features eleven tracks, including a number of instrumentals. The lyrics were written by Madhan Karky and Kabilan. The soundtrack album was released on 20 July 2012 at Sathyam Cinemas; it was presented by Vijay and received by Kannada lead actor Puneeth Rajkumar.

Rediff wrote: "Mugamoodi's numbers grab your attention and carry you with them". Milliblog wrote: "Tepid soundtrack from K". Behindwoods wrote: "On the whole, the music has provided a good platform for the superhero to soar".

Release
The satellite rights of the film were sold to Sun TV. The film was released worldwide screens on 31 August 2012 and it would be the 100th film to be released in 2012. Also, it is to be noted that the director has planned for upcoming sequels of Mugamoodi. Therefore, the director has planned to release a sequel every year. The first look and trailer of Jiiva's 'Mugamoodi' took place in a grand scale on 29 June 2012 at Sathyam Cinemas. The trailer was launched by Suriya and received by director Lingusamy while the first look was released by Suriya and Gautham Vasudev Menon. Mugamoodi released in over 500 screens in Tamil Nadu, and also opened in neighbouring states in good number of screens as well as in northern parts of India including Delhi and Mumbai. The film released simultaneously in Sri Lanka, Malaysia, Singapore, Canada, the UK, the US, and other parts of the world.

Reception
Critical responseMugamoodi received mixed reviews from critics. IBN reviewed the film positive and cited that it had a "different flavour" further adding: "For those who love the West and East's action films, Mugamoodi combines both to give some pleasure". Behindwoods Review Board rated it 3 out of 5 stating that it had a "pacy first half, [a] slow second half but [was] compensated by the overall performance and effort of the cast & crew". Malathi Rangarajan from The Hindu noted that it "travels on a terrain that’s new to Tamil cinema" and lauded Mysskin, saying that his "effort to make Mugamoodi appear as authentic as possible deserves to be commended". Prakash Upadhyaya of Oneindia.in recommended the film with a 3.5 out 5 rating.

However, Sify termed the film average and a "one-time watch", calling it "good in parts" and claiming that it had "very good music and background score by K, but lacks a proper script and a racy presentation". Pavithra Srinivasan of Rediff gave it 3.5 out of 5 stars, writing that it had "all the makings of a successful film but ends up disappointing", particularly criticizing Mysskin's screenplay that "fails him spectacularly". Vivek Ramz of In.com rated it 3.5 out of 5 and said that "Mugamoodi is no Batman, just Kanthaswamy'' revisited!"

Accolades

References

External links
 

2012 films
Indian martial arts films
Indian vigilante films
Films directed by Mysskin
2010s Tamil-language films
2010s Indian superhero films
Films scored by K (composer)
UTV Motion Pictures films
Fictional portrayals of the Tamil Nadu Police
Indian superhero films